The Presbyterian Church in Korea (DaeHanShinChuk) is a Reformed and Presbyterian denomination in South Korea. It adheres to the Apostles Creed and Westminster Confession. In 2004 it had 3,552 members and 58 congregations and 33 ordained ministers.

References 

Presbyterian denominations in South Korea
Presbyterian denominations in Asia